Popular Forces of Liberation may refer to:

 Fuerzas Populares de Liberación Farabundo Martí in El Salvador
 Popular Liberation Forces in Eritrea